Harðarson is an Icelandic surname  meaning son of Hörður. In Icelandic names, the name is not strictly a surname, but a patronymic. Notable people with the surname include:

Bjarni Harðarson (born 1961), Icelandic politician
Falur Harðarson (born 1968), Icelandic basketball player and coach
Ísak Harðarson (born 1956), Icelandic poet and translator
Jóhannes Harðarson
Kristján Harðarson

Similar name for a daughter is Harðardóttir.

Icelandic-language surnames
Patronymic surnames